Scholes Butler Birch (30 July 1826 – 13 April 1910) was an English first-class cricketer and medical doctor.

The son of the first-class cricketer Lea Birch, he was born at Failsworth, Lancashire and studied medicine at the University of St Andrews School of Medicine. He made his debut in first-class cricket for Manchester against Yorkshire at Manchester. He played in first-class matches for Manchester on six occasions between 1845 and 1852, including on three occasions when the matches were billed as Lancashire v Yorkshire in 1849 and 1851. Across six first-class matches, Birch scored 84 runs at an average of 7.00, with a high score of 33. He was one of the earliest members of the Free Foresters Cricket Club. He died in April 1910 at Cheshunt, Hertfordshire.

References

External links

1826 births
1910 deaths
People from Failsworth
English cricketers
Manchester Cricket Club cricketers
Lancashire cricketers
Alumni of the University of St Andrews
19th-century English medical doctors
20th-century English medical doctors